Agrarianism is a political and social philosophy that has promoted subsistence agriculture, smallholdings, and egalitarianism, with agrarian political parties normally supporting the rights and sustainability of small farmers and poor peasants against the wealthy in society. In highly developed and industrial nations or regions, it can denote use of financial and social incentives for self-sustainability, more community involvement in food production (such as allotment gardens) and smart growth that avoids urban sprawl, and also what many of its advocates contend are risks of human overpopulation; when overpopulation occurs, the available resources become too limited for the entire population to survive comfortably or at all in the long term.

Philosophy 
Some scholars suggest that agrarianism values rural society as superior to urban society and the independent farmer as superior to the paid worker, and sees farming as a way of life that can shape the ideal social values. It stresses the superiority of a simpler rural life as opposed to the complexity of city life. For example, M. Thomas Inge defines agrarianism by the following basic tenets:
Farming is the sole occupation that offers total independence and self-sufficiency.
Urban life, capitalism, and technology destroy independence and dignity and foster vice and weakness.
The agricultural community, with its fellowship of labor and co-operation, is the model society.
The farmer has a solid, stable position in the world order. They have "a sense of identity, a sense of historical and religious tradition, a feeling of belonging to a concrete family, place, and region, which are psychologically and culturally beneficial." The harmony of their life checks the encroachments of a fragmented, alienated modern society.
Cultivation of the soil "has within it a positive spiritual good" and from it the cultivator acquires the virtues of "honor, manliness, self-reliance, courage, moral integrity, and hospitality." They result from a direct contact with nature and, through nature, a closer relationship to God. The agrarian is blessed in that they follow the example of God in creating order out of chaos.

History

The philosophical roots of agrarianism include European and Chinese philosophers. The Chinese school of Agriculturalism (农家/農家) was a philosophy that advocated peasant utopian communalism and egalitarianism. In societies influenced by Confucianism, the farmer was considered an esteemed productive member of society, but merchants who made money were looked down upon. That influenced European intellectuals like François Quesnay, an avid Confucianist and advocate of China's agrarian policies, in forming the French agrarian philosophy of physiocracy. The physiocrats, along with the ideas of John Locke and the Romantic Era, formed the basis of modern European and American agrarianism.

Types of agrarianism

Physiocracy

Jeffersonian democracy
 

The United States president Thomas Jefferson was an agrarian who based his ideas about the budding American democracy around the notion that farmers are "the most valuable citizens" and the truest republicans. Jefferson and his support base were committed to American republicanism, which they saw as being in opposition to aristocracy and corruption, and which prioritized virtue, exemplified by the "yeoman farmer", "planters", and the "plain folk". In praising the rural farmfolk, the Jeffersonians felt that financiers, bankers and industrialists created "cesspools of corruption" in the cities and should thus be avoided.

The Jeffersonians sought to align the American economy more with agriculture than industry. Part of their motive to do so was Jefferson's fear that the over-industrialization of America would create a class of wage slaves who relied on their employers for income and sustenance. In turn, these workers would cease to be independent voters as their vote could be manipulated by said employers. To counter this, Jefferson introduced, as scholar Clay Jenkinson noted, "a graduated income tax that would serve as a disincentive to vast accumulations of wealth and would make funds available for some sort of benign redistribution downward" and tariffs on imported articles, which were mainly purchased by the wealthy. In 1811, Jefferson, writing to a friend, explained: "these revenues will be levied entirely on the rich... . the rich alone use imported articles, and on these alone the whole taxes of the general government are levied. the poor man ... pays not a farthing of tax to the general government, but on his salt."

There is general agreement that the substantial United States' federal policy of offering land grants (such as thousands of gifts of land to veterans) had a positive impact on economic development in the 19th century.

Agrarian socialism

Agrarian socialism is a form of agrarianism that is anti-capitalist in nature and seeks to introduce socialist economic systems in their stead.

Zapatismo

Notable agrarian socialists include Emiliano Zapata who was a leading figure in the Mexican Revolution. As part of the Liberation Army of the South, his group of revolutionaries fought on behalf of the Mexican peasants, whom they saw as exploited by the landowning classes. Zapata published Plan of Ayala, which called for significant land reforms and land redistribution in Mexico as part of the revolution. Zapata was killed and his forces crushed over the course of the Revolution, but his political ideas lived on in the form of Zapatismo.

Zapatismo would form the basis for neozapatismo, the ideology of the Zapatista Army of National Liberation. Known as Ejército Zapatista de Liberación Nacional or EZLN in Spanish, EZLN is a far-left libertarian socialist political and militant group that emerged in the state of Chiapas in southmost Mexico in 1994. EZLN and Neozapatismo, as explicit in their name, seek to revive the agrarian socialist movement of Zapata, but fuse it with new elements such as a commitment to indigenous rights and community-level decision making.

Subcommander Marcos, a leading member of the movement, argues that the peoples' collective ownership of the land was and is the basis for all subsequent developments the movement sought to create:...When the land became property of the peasants ... when the land passed into the hands of those who work it ... [This was] the starting point for advances in government, health, education, housing, nutrition, women’s participation, trade, culture, communication, and information ...[it was] recovering the means of production, in this case, the land, animals, and machines that were in the hands of large property owners.”

Maoism
Maoism, the far-left ideology of Mao Zedong and his followers, places a heavy emphasis on the role of peasants in its goals. In contrast to other Marxist schools of thought which normally seek to acquire the support of urban workers, Maoism sees the peasantry as key. Believing that "political power grows out of the barrel of a gun", Maoism saw the Chinese Peasantry as the prime source for a Marxist vanguard because it possessed two qualities: (i) they were poor, and (ii) they were a political blank slate; in Mao's words, “A clean sheet of paper has no blotches, and so the newest and most beautiful words can be written on it”. During the Chinese Civil War and the Second Sino-Japanese War, Mao and the Chinese Communist Party made extensive use of peasants and rural bases in their military tactics, often eschewing the cities.

Following the eventual victory of the Communist Party in both wars, the countryside and how it should be run remained a focus for Mao. In 1958, Mao launched the Great Leap Forward, a social and economic campaign which, amongst other things, altered many aspects of rural Chinese life. It introduced mandatory collective farming and forced the peasantry to organize itself into communal living units which were known as people's communes. These communes, which consisted of 5,000 people on average, were expected to meet high production quotas while the peasants who lived on them adapted to this radically new way of life. The communes were run as co-operatives where wages and money were replaced by work points. Peasants who criticised this new system were persecuted as "rightists" and "counter-revolutionaries". Leaving the communes was forbidden and escaping from them was difficult or impossible, and those who attempted it were subjected to party-orchestrated "public struggle sessions," which further jeopardized their survival. These public criticism sessions were often used to intimidate the peasants into obeying local officials and they often devolved into little more than public beatings.

On the communes, experiments were conducted in order to find new methods of planting crops, efforts were made to construct new irrigation systems on a massive scale, and the communes were all encouraged to produce steel backyard furnaces as part of an effort to increase steel production. However, following the Anti-Rightist Campaign, Mao had instilled a mass distrust of intellectuals into China, and thus engineers often were not consulted with regard to the new irrigation systems and the wisdom of asking untrained peasants to produce good quality steel from scrap iron was not publicly questioned. Similarly, the experimentation with the crops did not produce results. In addition to this the Four Pests Campaign was launched, in which the peasants were called upon to destroy sparrows and other wild birds that ate crop seeds, in order to protect fields. Pest birds were shot down or scared away from landing until they dropped from exhaustion. This campaign resulted in an ecological disaster that saw an explosion of the vermin population, especially crop-eating insects, which was consequently not in danger of being killed by predators.

None of these new systems were working, but local leaders did not dare to state this, instead, they falsified reports so as not to be punished for failing to meet the quotas. In many cases they stated that they were greatly exceeding their quotas, and in turn, the Chinese state developed a completely false sense of success with regard to the commune system.

All of this culminated in the Great Chinese Famine, which began in 1959, lasted 3 years, and saw an estimated 15 to 30 million Chinese people die. A combination of bad weather and the new, failed farming techniques that were introduced by the state led to massive shortages of food. By 1962, the Great Leap Forward was declared to be at an end.

In the late 1960s and early 1970s, Mao once again radically altered life in rural China with the launching of the Down to the Countryside Movement. As a response to the Great Chinese Famine, the Chinese President Liu Shaoqi began "sending down" urban youths to rural China in order to recover its population losses and alleviate overcrowding in the cities. However, Mao turned the practice into a political crusade, declaring that the sending down would strip the youth of any bourgeois tendencies by forcing them to learn from the unprivileged rural peasants. In reality, it was the Communist Party's attempt to reign in the Red Guards, who had become uncontrollable during the course of the Cultural Revolution. 10% of the 1970 urban population of China was sent out to remote rural villages, often in Inner Mongolia. The villages, which were still poorly recovering from the effects of the Great Chinese Famine, did not have the excess resources that were needed to support the newcomers. Furthermore, the so-called "sent-down youth" had no agricultural experience and as a result, they were unaccustomed to the harsh lifestyle that existed in the countryside, and their unskilled labor in the villages provided little benefit to the agricultural sector. As a result, many of the sent-down youth died in the countryside. The relocation of the youths was originally intended to be permanent, but by the end of the Cultural Revolution, the Communist Party relented and some of those who had the capacity to return to the cities were allowed to do so.

In imitation of Mao's policies, the Khmer Rouge of Cambodia (who were heavily funded and supported by the People's Republic of China) created their own version of the Great Leap Forward which was known as "Maha Lout Ploh". With the Great Leap Forward as its model, it had similarly disastrous effects, contributing to what is now known as the Cambodian genocide. As a part of the Maha Lout Ploh, the Khmer Rouge sought to create an entirely agrarian socialist society by forcibly relocating 100,000 people to move from Cambodia's cities into newly created communes. The Khmer Rouge leader, Pol Pot sought to "purify" the country by setting it back to "Year Zero", freeing it from "corrupting influences". Besides trying to completely de-urbanize Cambodia, ethnic minorities were slaughtered along with anyone else who was suspected of being a "reactionary" or a member of the "bourgeoisie", to the point that wearing glasses was seen as grounds for execution. The killings were only brought to an end when Cambodia was invaded by the neighboring socialist nation of Vietnam, whose army toppled the Khmer Rouge. However, with Cambodia's entire society and economy in disarray, including its agricultural sector, the country still plunged into renewed famine due to vast food shortages. However, as international journalists began to report on the situation and send images of it out to the world, a massive international response was provoked, leading to one of the most concentrated relief efforts of its time.

Notable agrarian parties

Peasant parties first appeared across Eastern Europe between 1860 and 1910, when commercialized agriculture and world market forces disrupted traditional rural society, and the railway and growing literacy facilitated the work of roving organizers. Agrarian parties advocated land reforms to redistribute land on large estates among those who work it. They also wanted village cooperatives to keep the profit from crop sales in local hands and credit institutions to underwrite needed improvements. Many peasant parties were also nationalist parties because peasants often worked their land for the benefit of landlords of different ethnicity.

Peasant parties rarely had any power before World War I but some became influential in the interwar era, especially in Bulgaria and Czechoslovakia. For a while, in the 1920s and the 1930s, there was a Green International (International Agrarian Bureau) based on the peasant parties in Bulgaria, Czechoslovakia, Poland, and Serbia. It functioned primarily as an information center that spread the ideas of agrarianism and combating socialism on the left and landlords on the right and never launched any significant activities.

Europe

Bulgaria
In Bulgaria, the Bulgarian Agrarian National Union (BZNS) was organized in 1899 to resist taxes and build cooperatives. BZNS came to power in 1919 and introduced many economic, social, and legal reforms. However, conservative forces crushed BZNS in a 1923 coup and assassinated its leader, Aleksandar Stamboliyski (1879–1923). BZNS was made into a communist puppet group until 1989, when it reorganized as a genuine party.

Czechoslovakia
In Czechoslovakia, the Republican Party of Agricultural and Smallholder People often shared power in parliament as a partner in the five-party pětka coalition. The party's leader, Antonín Švehla (1873–1933), was prime minister several times. It was consistently the strongest party, forming and dominating coalitions. It moved beyond its original agrarian base to reach middle-class voters. The party was banned by the National Front after the Second World War.

France
In France, the Hunting, Fishing, Nature, Tradition party is a moderate conservative, agrarian party, reaching a peak of 4.23% in the 2002 French presidential election. It would later on become affiliated to France's main conservative party, Union for a Popular Movement.  More recently, the Resistons! movement of Jean Lassalle espoused agrarianism.

Hungary
In Hungary, the first major agrarian party, the small-holders party was founded in 1908. The party became part of the government in the 1920s but lost influence in the government. A new party, the Independent Smallholders, Agrarian Workers and Civic Party was established in 1930 with a more radical program representing larger scale land redistribution initiatives. They implemented this program together with the other coalition parties after WWII. However, after 1949 the party was outlawed when a one-party system was introduced. They became part of the government again 1990–1994, and 1998-2002 after which they lost political support. The ruling Fidesz party has an agrarian faction, and promotes agrarian interest since 2010 with the emphasis now placed on supporting larger family farms versus small-holders.

Ireland

In the late 19th century, the Irish National Land League aimed to abolish landlordism in Ireland and enable tenant farmers to own the land they worked on. The "Land War" of 1878–1909 led to the Irish Land Acts, ending absentee landlords and ground rent and redistributing land among peasant farmers.

Post-independence, the Farmers' Party operated in the Irish Free State from 1922, folding into the National Centre Party in 1932. It was mostly supported by wealthy farmers in the east of Ireland.

Clann na Talmhan (Family of the Land; also called the National Agricultural Party) was founded in 1938. They focused more on the poor smallholders of the west, supporting land reclamation, afforestation, social democracy and rates reform. They formed part of the governing coalition of the Government of the 13th Dáil and Government of the 15th Dáil. Economic improvement in the 1960s saw farmers vote for other parties and Clann na Talmhan disbanded in 1965.

Latvia
In Latvia, the Union of Greens and Farmers is supportive of traditional small farms and perceives them as more environmentally friendly than large-scale farming: Nature is threatened by development, while small farms are threatened by large industrial-scale farms.

Lithuania
In Lithuania, as of 2017, the government is led by the Lithuanian Farmers and Greens Union, under the leadership of industrial farmer Ramūnas Karbauskis.

Nordic countries

Poland
In Poland, the Polish People's Party traces its tradition to an agrarian party in Austro-Hungarian-controlled Galician Poland. After the fall of the communist regime, PPP's biggest success came in 1993 elections, where it won 132 out of 460 parliamentary seats. Since then, PPP's support has steadily declined, until 2019, when they formed Polish Coalition with an anti- establishment, direct democracy Kukiz'15 party, and managed to get 8.5% of votes. Moreover, PPP tends to get much better results in local elections. In 2014 elections they have managed to get 23.88% of votes.

The right-wing Law and Justice party has also become supportive of agrarian policies in recent years and polls show that most of their support comes from rural areas. AGROunia resembles the features of agrarianism.

Romania 

In Romania, older party parties from Transylvania, Moldavia, and Wallachia merged to become the National Peasants' Party (PNȚ) in 1926. Iuliu Maniu (1873–1953) was a prime minister with an agrarian cabinet from 1928 to 1930 and briefly in 1932–1933, but the Great Depression made proposed reforms impossible. The forcefully-introduced and illegal communist regime dissolved the party in 1947 (along with other historical parties such as the National Liberal Party), but it reformed in 1989 after they fell from power.

The reformed party, which also incorporated elements of Christian democracy in its ideology, governed Romania as part of the Romanian Democratic Convention (CDR) between 1996 and 2000.

Serbia
In Serbia, Nikola Pašić (1845–1926) and his People's Radical Party dominated Serbian politics after 1903. The party also monopolized power in Yugoslavia from 1918 to 1929. During the dictatorship of the 1930s, the prime minister was from that party.

Ukraine
In Ukraine, the Radical Party of Oleh Lyashko has promised to purify the country of oligarchs "with a pitchfork". The party advocates a number of traditional left-wing positions (a progressive tax structure, a ban on agricultural land sale and eliminating the illegal land market, a tenfold increase in budget spending on health, setting up primary health centres in every village) and mixes them with strong nationalist sentiments.

United Kingdom
The heyday was eroded by hundreds of Acts of Parliament to expressly permit enclosure, chiefly from 1650 to the 1810s. Politicians standing strongly as reactionaries to this included the Levellers, those anti-industrialists (Luddites) going beyond opposing new weaving technology and, later, radicals such as William Cobbett.

A high level of net national or local self-sufficiency has a strong base in campaigns and movements. In the 19th century such empowered advocates included Peelites and most Conservatives. The 20th century saw the growth or start of influential non-governmental organisations, such as the National Farmers' Union of England and Wales, Campaign for Rural England, Friends of the Earth (EWNI) and of the England Wales, Scottish and Northern Irish political parties prefixed by and focussed on Green politics. The 21st century has seen decarbonisation already in electricity markets.  Following protests and charitable lobbying local food has seen growing market share, sometimes backed by wording in public policy papers and manifestos. The UK has many sustainability-prioritising businesses, green charity campaigns, events and lobby groups ranging from espousing allotment gardens (hobby community farming) through to a clear policy of local food and/or self-sustainability models.

Oceania

Australia
Historian F.K. Crowley finds that:

The National Party of Australia (formerly called the Country Party), from the 1920s to the 1970s, promulgated its version of agrarianism, which it called "countrymindedness".  The goal was to enhance the status of the graziers (operators of big sheep stations) and small farmers and justified subsidies for them.

New Zealand
The New Zealand Liberal Party aggressively promoted agrarianism in its heyday (1891–1912). The landed gentry and aristocracy ruled Britain at this time. New Zealand never had an aristocracy but its wealthy landowners largely controlled politics before 1891. The Liberal Party set out to change that by a policy it called "populism." Richard Seddon had proclaimed the goal as early as 1884: "It is the rich and the poor; it is the wealthy and the landowners against the middle and labouring classes. That, Sir, shows the real political position of New Zealand."  The Liberal strategy was to create a large class of small landowning farmers who supported Liberal ideals. The Liberal government also established the basis of the later welfare state such as old age pensions and developed a system for settling industrial disputes, which was accepted by both employers and trade unions. In 1893, it extended voting rights to women, making New Zealand the first country in the world to do so.

To obtain land for farmers, the Liberal government from 1891 to 1911 purchased  of Maori land. The government also purchased  from large estate holders for subdivision and closer settlement by small farmers. The Advances to Settlers Act (1894) provided low-interest mortgages, and the agriculture department disseminated information on the best farming methods. The Liberals proclaimed success in forging an egalitarian, anti-monopoly land policy. The policy built up support for the Liberal Party in rural North Island electorates. By 1903, the Liberals were so dominant that there was no longer an organized opposition in Parliament.

North America 
The United States and Canada both saw a rise of Agrarian-oriented parties in the early twentieth century as economic troubles motivated farming communities to become politically active. It has been proposed that different responses to agrarian protest largely determined the course of power generated by these newly-energized rural factions. According to Sociologist Barry Eidlin:"In the United States, Democrats adopted a co-optive response to farmer and labor protest, incorporating these constituencies into the New Deal coalition. In Canada, both mainstream parties adopted a coercive response, leaving these constituencies politically excluded and available for an independent left coalition."These reactions may have helped determine the outcome of agrarian power and political associations in the US and Canada.

United States of America

Kansas 
Economic desperation experienced by farmers across the state of Kansas in the nineteenth century spurred the creation of The People's Party in 1890, and soon-after would gain control of the governor's office in 1892. This party, consisting of a mix of Democrats, Socialists, Populists, and Fusionists, would find itself buckling from internal conflict regarding the unlimited coinage of silver. The Populists permanently lost power in 1898.

Oklahoma 
Oklahoma farmers considered their political activity during the early twentieth century due to the outbreak of war, depressed crop prices, and an inhibited sense of progression towards owning their own farms. Tenancy had been reportedly as high as 55% in Oklahoma by 1910. These pressures saw agrarian counties in Oklahoma supporting Socialist policies and politics, with the Socialist platform proposing a deeply agrarian-radical platform:...the platform proposed a "Renters and Farmer's Program" which was strongly agrarian radical in its insistence upon various measures to put land into "The hands of the actual tillers of the soil." Although it did not propose to nationalize privately owned land, it did offer numerous plans to enlarge the state's public domain, from which land would be rented at prevailing share rents to tenants until they had paid rent equal to the land's value. The tenant and his children would have the right of occupancy and use, but the 'title' would remind in the 'commonwealth', an arrangement that might be aptly termed 'Socialist fee simple'. They proposed to exempt from taxation all farm dwellings, animals, and improvements up to the value of $1,000. The State Board of Agriculture would encourage 'co-operative societies' of farmers to make plans f or the purchase of land, seed, tools, and for preparing and selling produce. In order to give farmers essential  services at cost, the Socialists called for the creation of state banks and mortgage agencies, crop insurance, elevators, and warehouses.This agrarian-backed Socialist party would win numerous offices, causing a panic within the local Democratic party. This agrarian-Socialist movement would be inhibited by voter suppression laws aimed at reducing the participation of voters of color, as well as national wartime policies intended to disrupt political elements considered subversive. This party would peak in power in 1914.

Back-to-the-land movement 
Agrarianism is similar to but not identical with the back-to-the-land movement. Agrarianism concentrates on the fundamental goods of the earth, on communities of more limited economic and political scale than in modern society, and on simple living, even when the shift involves questioning the "progressive" character of some recent social and economic developments. Thus, agrarianism is not industrial farming, with its specialization on products and industrial scale.

See also

Agrarian socialism
 Farmer–Labor Party, USA early 20th century
Jeffersonian democracy
 Labour-Farmer Party, Japan 1920s
 Minnesota Farmer–Labor Party, USA early 20th century
Nordic agrarian parties
Yeoman, English farmers

References

Further reading

Agrarian values 
 Brass, Tom. Peasants, Populism and Postmodernism: The Return of the Agrarian Myth (2000) 
 

 
 * Inge, M. Thomas. Agrarianism in American Literature (1969)
 Kolodny, Annette. The Land before Her: Fantasy and Experience of the American Frontiers, 1630–1860 (1984). online edition
 Marx, Leo. The Machine in the Garden: Technology and the Pastoral Ideal in America (1964).
 Murphy, Paul V. The Rebuke of History: The Southern Agrarians and American Conservative Thought (2000)
  Parrington, Vernon. Main Currents in American Thought (1927), 3-vol online 
 
 Thompson, Paul, and Thomas C. Hilde, eds. The Agrarian Roots of Pragmatism (2000)

Primary sources
 Sorokin, Pitirim A. et al., eds. A Systematic Source Book in Rural Sociology (3 vol. 1930) vol 1 pp. 1–146 covers many major thinkers down to 1800

Europe 
 
 Bell, John D. Peasants in Power: Alexander Stamboliski and the Bulgarian Agrarian National Union, 1899–1923(1923)
 Donnelly, James S. Captain Rock: The Irish Agrarian Rebellion of 1821–1824  (2009)
 Donnelly, James S.  Irish Agrarian Rebellion, 1760–1800 (2006)
 Gross, Feliks, ed. European Ideologies: A Survey of 20th Century Political Ideas (1948) pp. 391–481 online edition, on Russia and Bulgaria
 Kubricht, Andrew Paul. "The Czech Agrarian Party, 1899-1914: a study of national and economic agitation in the Habsburg monarchy" (PhD thesis, Ohio State University Press, 1974)
 
 Narkiewicz, Olga A. The Green Flag: Polish Populist Politics, 1867–1970 (1976).
 Oren, Nissan. Revolution Administered: Agrarianism and Communism in Bulgaria (1973), focus is post 1945
 Paine, Thomas. Agrarian Justice (1794)
 
 Roberts, Henry L. Rumania: Political Problems of an Agrarian State (1951).

North America 
 
 
 Goodwyn, Lawrence. The Populist Moment: A Short History of the Agrarian Revolt in America (1978), 1880s and 1890s in U.S.
 
 
 Lipset, Seymour Martin. Agrarian socialism: the Coöperative Commonwealth Federation in Saskatchewan (1950), 1930s-1940s
 McConnell, Grant. The decline of agrarian democracy(1953), 20th century U.S.
 Mark, Irving. Agrarian conflicts in colonial New York, 1711–1775 (1940)
 Ochiai, Akiko. Harvesting Freedom: African American Agrarianism in Civil War Era South Carolina (2007)
 Robison, Dan Merritt. Bob Taylor and the agrarian revolt in Tennessee (1935)
 Stine, Harold E. The agrarian revolt in South Carolina;: Ben Tillman and the Farmers' Alliance (1974)
 Summerhill, Thomas. Harvest of Dissent: Agrarianism in Nineteenth-Century New York (2005)
 Szatmary, David P. Shays' Rebellion: The Making of an Agrarian Insurrection (1984), 1787 in Massachusetts
 Woodward, C. Vann.   Tom Watson: Agrarian Rebel (1938) online edition

Global South 
 Brass, Tom (ed.). New Farmers' Movements in India (1995) 304 pages.
 
 
Handy, Jim. Revolution in the Countryside: Rural Conflict and Agrarian Reform in Guatemala, 1944–1954 (1994)
 
 
 Paige, Jeffery M.  Agrarian revolution: social movements and export agriculture in the underdeveloped world (1978)  435 pages excerpt and text search
 Sanderson, Steven E.   Agrarian populism and the Mexican state: the struggle for land in Sonora (1981)
Stokes, Eric. The Peasant and the Raj: Studies in Agrarian Society and Peasant Rebellion in Colonial India (1980)
 
 Tannenbaum, Frank.  The Mexican Agrarian Revolution (1930)

External links
Writings of a Deliberate Agrarian
The New Agrarian